Langvatnet is a lake on the border of Skjåk Municipality in Innlandet county and Stryn Municipality in Vestland county, Norway. Most of the  lake lies within Skjåk municipality. The lake lies in a narrow mountain valley in the Strynefjellet mountains. The lake is wedged between the mountain Langvasseggi to the north and Raudeggi to the south. The lake lies along the border of the Breheimen National Park.

See also
List of lakes in Norway

References

Skjåk
Stryn
Lakes of Innlandet
Lakes of Vestland